RTLS may refer to:

 Real-time locating system, an automated system to track people or objects
 Ravenna Training and Logistics Site, an Ohio Army National Guard base
 Return to launch site, a procedure where all or part of an orbital launch vehicle returns to land near the launch site